Janków Zaleśny  is a village in the administrative district of Gmina Raszków, within Ostrów Wielkopolski County, Greater Poland Voivodeship, in west-central Poland.

The village has a population of 540.

References

Villages in Ostrów Wielkopolski County